Kinnear's Mills is a municipality located in the Les Appalaches Regional County Municipality in the Chaudière-Appalaches region of Quebec, Canada. Its population was 397 as of the Canada 2021 Census. It is known as the "Village of Churches," as four churches (Anglican, Catholic, Methodist, and United) are located close to each other in the village centre.

James G. Kinnear (1924-2010) published a book, "Kinnear's Mills," documenting the creation of the village and the family of James Kinnear, after whom the municipality is named.

Gallery

References

External links 
 
 Kinnear's Mills' website
 Kinnear's Mills Heritage Site

Municipalities in Quebec
Incorporated places in Chaudière-Appalaches